Kevin Edward (born 24 March 1991), is an international soccer player from Saint Lucia, who plays for Platinum FC as a midfielder.

Career
He made his international debut for Saint Lucia in 2011 and has appeared in FIFA World Cup qualifying matches.

References

 
 asia.eurosport.com

Living people
1991 births
Saint Lucian footballers
Saint Lucia international footballers
Association football midfielders